Miroslav Válek (July 17, 1927 – January 27, 1991) was a Slovak poet, publicist and politician. He was also the Minister of Culture in the government of Slovak Socialist Republic within the Czechoslovak Socialist Republic.

Biography 

Miroslav Válek was born in Trnava and from 1947 to 1949 he studied at Vysoká škola obchodná in Bratislava. During the years 1949–1963 he worked as an editor for magazines (Slovenský roľník, Týždeň, Družstevný obzor), finally becoming general editor of Mladá tvorba.

In 1962 he joined the Communist party of Czechoslovakia. In the years 1966–1967 he was general editor of the magazine Romboid and also the secretary of Zväz slovenských spisovateľov, later (1967–1968) serving as its president. Válek was politically active and occupied some high positions in Communist party. In years 1969–1988 Válek was Minister of Culture. It is said he was trying to soften the effects Normalization had on Slovak culture. He left political life soon after the November change 1989 (Velvet Revolution) came.

He died in Bratislava.

Works

Books of poetry 

1959 - Dotyky (Touches)
1961 - Príťažlivosť (Attraction)
1963 - Nepokoj (Unrest)
1965 - Milovanie v husej koži (Lovemaking in Goose Skin)
1973 - Súvislosti (Contexts)
1976 - Slovo (Word)
1977 - Z vody (From Water)
1977 - Zakázaná láska (Forbbiden Love)
1983 - Básne (Verses) (collected edition)

1927 births
1991 deaths
Slovak poets
Politicians from Trnava
20th-century poets